Dawson is a closed station located in the locality of Dawson on the Maffra railway line in Victoria, Australia.

History
Opened in 1884, it was originally called Glenmaggie Railway Station, with the name changed to Dawson Railway Station about February 1888. The station building was burnt down in 1893, which was thought to be the act of burglars.

A post office operated at the station from 1884 until 1927, when it moved away.

References

Disused railway stations in Victoria (Australia)
Transport in Gippsland (region)
Shire of Wellington